Flying the Flag was a BBC radio sitcom set in a British embassy in the Eastern Bloc during the Cold War. It ran for four series, aired from 1987 to 1992, which have been repeated numerous times.

Synopsis

Created during the Cold War, this BBC Radio 4 sitcom chronicled the vagaries of diplomatic life in a fictitious eastern-bloc country.  Dinsdale Landen starred as the British ambassador, with Peter Acre (as First Secretary William Frost) and Moir Leslie (as Helen Waterson, the embassy's typist and secretary) as his assistants, and Stephen Greif as the US Ambassador.

Later series moved with the times as the country embraced perestroika.

Cast

Regular Cast
Her Majesty's Ambassador Mr McKenzie - Dinsdale Landen
William Frost - Peter Acre
Helen Waterson - Moir Leslie
Spiro Wineberg, United States Ambassador - Stephen Greif
Colonel Surikov - Christopher Benjamin

Production
Writer - Alex Shearer
Producer - Pete Atkin (s.1-2), Neil Cargill (s.3)

Episode list

See also
Ambassadors (TV series)
epguides.com
radiolistings.co.uk

1987 radio programme debuts
1992 disestablishments
BBC Radio comedy programmes
Works about diplomacy
Works about diplomats